Helge Jensen (12 May 1896 – 2 December 1961) was a Danish modern pentathlete. He competed at the 1924 and 1928 Summer Olympics.

References

External links
 

1896 births
1961 deaths
Danish male modern pentathletes
Olympic modern pentathletes of Denmark
Modern pentathletes at the 1924 Summer Olympics
Modern pentathletes at the 1928 Summer Olympics
Sportspeople from Copenhagen
Danish resistance members
Danish military officers